Taheri Rural District is in the Central District of Kangan County, Bushehr province, Iran. At the census of 2006, its population was 3,886 in 810 households; there were 8,320 inhabitants in 1,524 households at the following census of 2011; and in the most recent census of 2016, the population of the rural district was 23,138 in 2,080 households. The largest of its 10 villages was Shirinu, with 9,976 people.

References 

Rural Districts of Bushehr Province
Populated places in Kangan County